Cathedral Square, locally known simply as the Square, is the geographical centre and heart of Christchurch, New Zealand, where the city's Anglican cathedral, ChristChurch Cathedral is located. The square stands at the theoretical crossing of the city's two main orthogonal streets, Colombo Street and Worcester Street, though in practice both have been either blocked off or detoured around the square itself. The cathedral was badly damaged in the February 2011 Christchurch earthquake.

Naming 
The square was originally intended to be called Ridley Square, after the Protestant martyr Nicholas Ridley, but in Edward Jollie's 1850 plan of central Christchurch it is clearly marked Cathedral Square. Ridley's co-martyrs and colleague bishops, Cranmer and Latimer have Squares named after them, not far distant from Cathedral Square. The original choice of Ridley is another of Christchurch's many references to Oxford, since Ridley was martyred there.

History 
In the original survey of central Christchurch (known as the Black Map), which was undertaken in 1850, it was envisaged for Christ's College and ChristChurch Cathedral to be built adjacent to one another in Cathedral Square, modelled on Christ Church, Oxford. The area set aside for the college in Cathedral Square was found to be insufficient, and Henry Sewell suggested in June 1853 to move the college to land reserved for the Christchurch Botanic Gardens. This transaction was formalised through The Cathedral Square Ordinance 1858, a law passed by the Canterbury Provincial Council in October 1858.

Christianity has adopted the practice of praying towards the East as the Orient was thought of as containing the mankind's original home. Hence, most Christian churches are oriented towards the east, and to comply with this convention, Henry Harper, Christchurch's first Bishop, lobbied to have the eastern side of Cathedral Square to be used for the pro-cathedral. That way, the main entrance would face Colombo Street, resulting in praying towards the east in line with convention. The Cathedral Square Amendment Ordinance 1859, which was passed a year after the previous ordinance, formalised the change in placement of the cathedral.

Just before work on the cathedral's foundations began in 1864, the alignment of Colombo Street through Cathedral Square was changed again by introducing a curve towards the west; the western side of the legal road had a radius of 3 chains 75 links. The purpose of this change was to allow the placement of the cathedral slightly further west, making its tower visible along Colombo Street from a distance. Up to the point of work starting on the cathedral, here was initially little development.

A statue to John Robert Godley, the city's founder, was unveiled on 6 August 1867 on a pedestal opposite the cathedral. It was the first public statue in New Zealand. The city's central post office was located alongside the square in 1879.

Over the years Cathedral Square has been redesigned on several occasions. Two significant changes took place when the road in front of the cathedral was closed in 1965, and the road in front of the Post Office closed in 1972. In the late 1990s / early 2000s, the Square underwent a significant reconstruction using new tiling. This was an often criticised project, for example for the amount of glare that the tiles gave off in dry weather conditions, or the tiles being slippery when wet.

Although always called a "square", its shape is that of a cruciform.

Registered heritage places

Cathedral Square has a large number of buildings and statues that are registered as heritage items with Heritage New Zealand. Many of those were damaged in the February 2011 Christchurch earthquake and some of these will be lost as a consequence.

Category I places
 ChristChurch Cathedral is arguably the most important heritage building. Its register number is 46 and it was registered on 7 April 1983.
 The Press Building was registered on 2 April 1984, with its register number 302. It was significantly damaged in the February 2011 earthquake and was demolished in July 2011.
 The former Chief Post Office was also registered on 2 April 1984, with its register number 291.
 The Old Government Building was registered on 5 April 1984, with its register number 301.
 The Citizens' War Memorial was registered on 6 September 1984, with its register number 3693.
 The Godley Statue was registered on 2 April 1985, with its register number 3666. The statue fell off its plinth in the 2011 Christchurch earthquake and time capsules discovered inside the plinth.
 The Regent Theatre was registered on 30 August 1990, with its register number 1918.
 The Lyttelton Times Building was registered on 16 December 1994, with its register number 7216. It was demolished in 2011.

Category II places
 The Sevicke Jones Building was registered on 28 April 1995, with its register number 7226. The building collapsed in the February 2011 earthquake.
 Warner's Hotel was registered on 24 April 1997, with its register number 7384. The historic part of the hotel was demolished.

Transport function 

When steam trams began operating in the city in 1880, they left from the Square. Later, when buses replaced trams in 1954, the Square was used as the main point of departure. Trams returned in 1995, with the introduction of a tourist tram ride around the central city. Most buses left the Square when the Bus Exchange in Lichfield Street opened in November 2000. Since then, the public transport use of the Square was by the airport bus, taxis and shuttles. Since the February 2011 Christchurch earthquake, the core of the central city has been closed to the public. The first part of the central city, Cashel Street between Colombo Street and Oxford Terrace, is planned to be open again on 29 October 2011. Other areas, including Cathedral Square, will follow later.

For many years, the square was a busy road intersection. In 1962, the road in front of the cathedral was closed. In 1972 it was redeveloped to provide large pedestrian areas, and the south-west quadrant was closed to traffic.

Current function 

The square was the city's main meeting place for people taking a break from their work, or just visiting the city, and is a regular site of street performers and speakers of all varieties. The most well-known of these was The Wizard of New Zealand.

Since the year 2000, The Chalice, a large piece of modern sculpture in the form of an inverted cone, has stood in the square subverting the shape of the spire that rose above the cathedral. The Chalice, designed by New Zealand artist Neil Dawson, is made up of forty-two leaf patterns featuring different native plants. The Square and the area surrounding it now open to the public once more.

The Christchurch Central Recovery Plan published July 2012 identified 18 key buildings, 'frames' and precincts for recovery, and set timelines (generally five years) for rebuilding these areas inside the city including: The Square. However with few exceptions those deadlines proved to be too ambitious and much remains to be done ten years later. Meanwhile church activities were moved in August 2013 to the newly constructed and highly innovative Cardboard Cathedral nearby, since repairs to the existing cathedral did not begin until May 2020.

See also

 Aotea Square, Auckland
 Civic Square, Wellington
 The Octagon, Dunedin

Notes

References

External links
 Christchurch City Library article

Busking venues
Streets in Christchurch
Tourist attractions in Christchurch
Christchurch Central City
Squares in Christchurch